The Ballad Of Renegade Nell is an upcoming British historical television series for Disney+. Written by Sally Wainwright, the series is produced by The Lookout Point. The series will star Louisa Harland, Joely Richardson, Adrian Lester, Nick Mohammed and Craig Parkinson.

Synopsis
Nell Jackson (Harland) finds herself framed for murder and becomes a female highwayman in eighteenth-century England. She becomes the most feared highwaywoman in the country.

Cast
 Louisa Harland as Nell Jackson
 Joely Richardson as Lady Eularia Moggerhanger
 Adrian Lester as Earl of Poynton
 Nick Mohammed as Billy Blind
 Craig Parkinson as Sam Jackson
 Florence Keen as George Jackson
 Frank Dillane as Charles Devereux 
 Alice Kremelberg as Sofia Wilmot  
 Jake Dunn as Thomas Jackson
 Pip Torrens as Lord Blancheford
 Bo Bragason as Roxy Jackson
 Enyi Okoronkwo as Rasselas

Production
In April 2021 it was revealed that Disney+ had acquired the series from British screenwriter Sally Wainwright. Ben Taylor, Amanda Brotchie and MJ Delaney are directing episodes. Faith Penhale, Will Johnston, Louise Mutter and Johanna Deveraux are executive producers. Jon Jennings is series producer and Stella Merz producer.

Casting
In August 2022 Louisa Harland, Nick Mohammed, Joely Richardson, and Adrian Lester were announced as being among the cast for the series.

Filming
Principal photography was reported to have started with a nine-month schedule for the planned eight episodes.
 Richardson was pictured in costume in Oxford, England in October 2022.

Broadcast
The Ballad of Renegade Nell is expected to stream on Disney+ in 2023.

References

External links

2023 British television series debuts
Upcoming comedy television series
Disney+ original programming
English-language television shows
Television series set in the 18th century
Television shows filmed in England